Vivimarie VanderPoorten is a Sri Lankan poet. Her book Nothing Prepares You won the 2007 Gratiaen Prize. She was also awarded the 2009 SAARC Poetry Award in Delhi.

Early life and education

Born in Kandy, Sri Lanka of Belgian and Sinhala ancestry, Vanderpoorten grew up in Kurunegala. She holds a BA from the University of Kelaniya and an MA and PhD from the University of Ulster, UK.

Career
VanderPoorten is currently a senior lecturer in English language, literature and linguistics at the Open University of Sri Lanka.

Vanderpoorten's first book, Nothing Prepares You, was published in 2007 by Zeus Publishers. Her second collection of poems, Stitch Your Eyelids Shut (2010) addresses issues that include feminism and the aftermath of Sri Lanka's Civil War. Her third collection of poems "Borrowed Dust" was published by Sarasavi, Colombo in 2017. Vivimarie made an appearance at the Galle Literary Festival 2011, where she read poetry about her reaction to the killing of Lasantha Wickrematunge.

Her work has been translated into Sinhalese, Spanish and Nepalese and Swedish, and published in India, Bangladesh, Mexico, Sweden and the UK, as well as in online journals such as sugar mule and the open access journal 'postcolonial text'.

She lists Kamala Das, Margaret Atwood, Maya Angelou Anne Sexton and Sharon Olds among authors who have influenced her, and Moshin Hamid, Khaled Hosseini Chimamanda Ngozi Adichie and Jeanette Winterson as contemporary writers that she reads.

Critical reception

Her poetry has been called "gentle, reflective minimalism which touches the soul" by Dr. Sinharaja Tammita-Delgoda, the chairman of the panel of judges who awarded her the Gratiaen Prize Neloufer de Mel said, of her first book "nothing prepares you is a remarkable first book which announces the entry of a very talented poet onto the stage of Sri Lankan creative writing in English. Vanderpoorten’s poems have an impressive range of subject matter from the personal to the political and reflect saliently on issues of gender, race and class while offering us vivid contexts of love, loss, violence and joy. They exemplify a good command of rhyme and rhythm, and in their economy of utterance offer an enabling lucidity within which poet and reader can meet, and memorably so for the reader."

Awards and honours

Her first book Nothing Prepares You was awarded the 2007 Gratiaen Prize and the 2009 SAARC Poetry Award. She won the State Literary Award for English poetry (sharing the award with another Sri Lankan poet, Ramya Chamalie Jirasinghe) in October 2011. Her third collection of poems, Borrowed Dust (in manuscript form) was shortlisted for the 2016 Gratiaen Prize. Her poetry is taught in a number of university courses and a poem from her first collection is currently on the GCE (Advanced Level) English syllabus in Sri Lanka.

References

Sources
sundaytimes.lk
sundaytimes.lk
gratiaen.com
bbc.co.uk

Academic staff of the Open University of Sri Lanka
Alumni of Ulster University
Burgher academics
Burgher poets
Burgher writers
Living people
People from Kandy
Sinhalese academics
Sinhalese poets
Sinhalese writers
Sri Lankan people of Belgian descent
Sri Lankan women poets
Sri Lankan women academics
21st-century Sri Lankan writers
21st-century Sri Lankan women writers
Year of birth missing (living people)